The Hole in the Wall is a 1929 pre-Code mystery drama film directed by Robert Florey, and starring Claudette Colbert and Edward G. Robinson. This early talking picture was the first appearance of Edward G. Robinson in the role of a gangster, and "can be viewed as a dry run for his eventual success (in 1931 in Little Caesar)". It was also one of Colbert's first film appearances.

It was shot at the Astoria Studios in New York. The film is a remake of an earlier 1921 silent The Hole in the Wall.

Plot
A con man called The Fox teams up with a fake fortune teller named Madame Mystera to bilk naive people out of their money. When Madame Mystera dies in an elevated train derailment, The Fox hires a woman named Jean Oliver to replace her. But as time goes on, he comes to believe that Jean actually does have real supernatural powers.

Cast
Claudette Colbert as Jean Oliver
Edward G. Robinson as The Fox
David Newell as Gordon Grant
Nellie Savage as Madame Mystera
Donald Meek as Goofy
Alan Brooks as Jim
Louise Closser Hale as Mrs. Ramsay
Katherine Emmet as Mrs. Carlake
Marcia Kagno as Marcia
Barry Macollum as Dogface
George MacQuarrie as  Inspector
Helen Crane as Mrs. Lyons

Criticism
According to critic Troy Howarth, the film "is an interesting amalgam of gangster melodrama and horror, one in which Edward G. Robinson steals the show." Colbert's "character becomes more complex as the picture unfolds, and the actress keeps up just fine." He commented that Florey's bizarre set designs for the medium's den looked as if they were inspired by the German film The Cabinet of Dr. Caligari.

References

External links

 
 

1929 films
1920s English-language films
American black-and-white films
Films directed by Robert Florey
American gangster films
1929 directorial debut films
American mystery drama films
1920s mystery drama films
Paramount Pictures films
Films shot at Astoria Studios
1929 drama films
1920s American films